The 2019–20 Uganda Premier League was the 53rd season of the Uganda Premier League, the top-tier football league in Uganda.

The season was abruptly ended on 20 May 2020 due to the COVID-19 pandemic with Vipers SC declared as champions. Matches were suspended on March 18 with more than 75 percent league matches already held.

Participating teams
The 2019–20 Uganda Premier League is being contested by 16 teams. Nyamityobora FC, Ndejje University, and Paidha Black Angels were relegated to the FUFA Big League from the 2018–19 Uganda Premier League season. They were replaced by Proline, winners of the Rwenzori group, Wakiso Giants, winners of the Elgon group, and playoff winners Kyetume.

Kirinya-Jinja SS were renamed as Busoga United FC.

Some of the Kampala clubs may on occasions also play home matches at the Mandela National Stadium.

League table

References

Ugandan Super League seasons
Uganda
Premier League
Uganda Premier League, 2019-20